

The table below includes sites listed on the National Register of Historic Places (NRHP) in Jefferson County, Kentucky except those in the following neighborhoods/districts of Louisville: Anchorage, Downtown, The Highlands, Old Louisville, Portland and the West End (including Algonquin, California, Chickasaw, Park Hill, Parkland, Russell and Shawnee). Links to tables of listings in these other areas are provided below.

There are 492 properties and districts in the county listed on the National Register, including 8 National Historic Landmarks and 2 National Cemeteries. Latitude and longitude coordinates of the 221 sites listed on this page may be displayed in a map or exported in several formats by clicking on one of the links in the box below the map of Kentucky to the right.

Current listings

Other neighborhoods

|}

Former listings

|}

See also

 National Register of Historic Places listings in Kentucky
 List of National Historic Landmarks in Kentucky
 List of attractions and events in the Louisville metropolitan area

References

Jefferson
National Register, Jefferson County